Le Kiri Kandulu (Blood, Milk and Tears) is a 2003 Sri Lankan Sinhala drama film directed and produced by Udayakantha Warnasuriya. It stars Tony Ranasinghe and Nilmini Tennakoon in lead roles along with Buddhika Jayaratne  and Sanath Gunathilake. Music composed by Sangeeth Wickramasinghe. It is the 1009th Sri Lankan film in the Sinhala cinema.

Plot
Jayananda is about 60 years old and is employed as an Executive in a private company. Jayananda and his wife Natalie live with their married daughter, her husband, and two children, and enjoy a very happy and carefree life. One night when he was driving along with his wife, through his negligence, his vehicle collides with another vehicle. The occupants of the other car were a young couple Upendra and Veena. Veena was carrying a full term baby close to giving birth, when the accident happened, and due to the accident she gives birth to a still born child.

Upendra and Veena who were eagerly anticipating the birth of a child for many years, were devastated. Their anger against Jayaynanda, whose negligence deprived them of a lively bouncing baby who would have so enriched their lives, was boundless. They looked upon him as a murderer, and Jayananda himself who was extremely fond of children, suffered in agony at the terrible outcome of the accident for which he was responsible. Witness as the story provides twist after twist, and one of the most exciting cinematic endings.

Cast
 Tony Ranasinghe as Jayananda Ratnapala
 Nilmini Tennakoon as Veena Jayaweera
 Buddhika Jayaratne as Upendra
 Sanath Gunathilake as Asela
 Nisansala Jayatunga as Menuka 'Menu'
 Sriyani Amarasena as Nethalie 
 Dayadeva Edirisinghe as Police Inspector
 Sarath Chandrasiri as Court bailiff
 Chitra Warakagoda as Veena's Amma
 Palitha Silva as Prosecutor
 Kingsley Loos as Defense attorney
 Keerthi Ranjith Peiris as Sub-Police Inspector
 Nethalie Nanayakkara as Upendra's mother
 Palitha Galappaththi as Reporter
 Dayaratne Siriwardena as Accident scene reprimander
 Umali Thilakarathne as Nethalie's servant
 Mihira Sirithilaka in a minor role. His maiden cinema appearance.

References

2003 films
2000s Sinhala-language films
Films directed by Udayakantha Warnasuriya